The Wages of Sin was a 1929 drama film directed, written and produced by Oscar Micheaux. It was a race movie, featuring an all-black cast, headed by William A. Clayton, Jr. and Bessie Givens. It is considered lost.

Cast
In alphabetical order
 William A. Clayton, Jr.
 Bessie Givens
 Ione McCarthy
 Kathleen Noisette
 Alice B. Russell
 Ethel Smith
 Gertrude Snelson
 Lorenzo Tucker

References

External links
 
 

1929 films
1929 drama films
1920s English-language films
Films directed by Oscar Micheaux
Lost American films
Race films
American black-and-white films
1929 lost films
Lost drama films
1920s American films